Odontasteridae is a family of sea stars. Members of the family are known as cushion stars and have relatively broad discs and five short tapering arms.

Genera
The following genera are listed in the World Register of Marine Species:

Acodontaster Verrill, 1899
Diabocilla McKnight, 2006
Diplodontias Fisher, 1908
Eurygonias Farquhar, 1913
Hoplaster Perrier, in Milne-Edwards, 1882
Odontaster Verrill, 1880

References

 
Echinoderm families